The median income per member of household is a measure used by statisticians and the US Census Bureau to determine the median income that exists in a household for each of its members. In order to obtain this number the median household income is divided by the median number of persons in households of the same income group. For example, in the United States the median household income in the year 2004 was $44,389, while the median income per member of household was $23,535.

See also

 Household income in the United States
 Median household income
 Income distribution
 Poverty in the United States
 Income

References

Income in the United States
Household income